The 1946 Bucknell Bison football team was an American football team that represented Bucknell University as an independent during the 1946 college football season. In its seventh season under head coach Al Humphreys, the team compiled a 3–6 record. Gene Hubka was the team captain.

The team played its home games at Memorial Stadium on the university campus in Lewisburg, Pennsylvania.

Schedule

After the season

The 1947 NFL Draft was held on December 16, 1946. The following Bison was selected.

References

Bucknell
Bucknell Bison football seasons
Bucknell Bison football